Cristóbal Andrade León (born in 1989) is a Chilean teacher who was elected as a member of the Chilean Constitutional Convention. Andrade is noted for his trademark blue Tyrannosaurus rex costume, which he wears to sessions of the Constitutional Convention. Andrade wears the costume in order to showcase his independence from traditional Chilean politicians.

He is evangelical.

References

External links
 Profile at Lista del Pueblo

Living people
1989 births
Chilean people
People from Quilpué
21st-century Chilean politicians
Members of the List of the People
Members of the Chilean Constitutional Convention